John Bascom Crenshaw (1861–1942) was the head of the Department of Modern Languages at the Georgia Institute of Technology for 38 years, and also served as the school's first athletic director, in which capacity he started Georgia Tech's lacrosse team.

References

1861 births
1942 deaths
Georgia Tech Yellow Jackets athletic directors
Georgia Tech faculty